Thedinen Vanthathu is a 1997 Indian Tamil-language comedy film directed by Ravi Varma. The film stars Prabhu, Goundamani, Mantra and Amrutha. It was released on 30 October 1997 as one of the Deepavali releases.

Plot

Velumani (Prabhu), an innocent bank watchman, loses his job after two robbers steal one crore in his bank. In a misunderstanding, a hotel manager thinks that Velumani is a bank manager. Tamizhmani (Goundamani), the hotel server, knows his secret but Velumani manages him by giving him a lottery ticket. The next day, they have the winning numbers. Tamizhmani immediately resigns from his job, but the lottery ticket was a fake.

Viswanathan (Vennira Aadai Moorthy) has two daughters:  Mythili (Amrutha) and Janaki (Mantra). Viswanathan looks for grooms for several years and decides to ask an astrologer about it. The astrologer tells him that grooms will approach him soon. Accidentally, the bank robbers' bag and the astrologer's bag get interchanged. Then, many bags get interchanged. Finally, Velumani and Tamizhmani get the money bag and they hide it in an unoccupied house. Soon the house gets occupied by Viswanathan's family. A racy and funny chase begins for the money bag.

Cast

Prabhu as Velumani / 'Coimbatore' Gopalakrishnan
Goundamani as Tamizhmani / 'Pollachi' Ponnusamy
Mantra as Janaki 
Amrutha as Mythili
Vennira Aadai Moorthy as Viswanathan
Anuradha as Visalam
Balu Anand as Peter Pandian
Prathap K. Pothan as Vicky
Crazy Mohan as Bank Manager
Idichapuli Selvaraj as Hotel Owner
Gowtham Sundararajan as Thief
Vichu Viswanath as Thief
Meesai Murugesan
M. R. Krishnamurthy
Marimuthu
Jayamani as Smuggler
Manohar 
Kovai Senthil as an astrologer

Soundtrack

The film score and the soundtrack were composed by Sirpy. The soundtrack, released in 1997, features five tracks with lyrics written by Pazhani Bharathi.

References

1997 films
Indian comedy films
1990s Tamil-language films
Films with screenplays by Crazy Mohan
Lottery fraud in fiction
1997 comedy films
Films scored by Sirpy